Year 1470 (MCDLXX) was a common year starting on Monday (link will display the full calendar) of the Julian calendar.

Events 
 January–December 
 March 12 – Wars of the Roses in England – Battle of Losecoat Field: The House of York defeats the House of Lancaster. 
 March 20 – The Battle of Nibley Green is the last fought between the private armies of feudal magnates in England.
 Spring: Anglo-Hanseatic War: Hanseatic League privateers set sail.
 May 15 – Charles VIII of Sweden, who has served three terms as King of Sweden, dies. Sten Sture the Elder proclaims himself Regent of Sweden the following day. 
 June 1 – Sten Sture is recognised as Swedish ruler by the estates.
 July 12 – The Ottomans capture Euboea.
 August 20 – Battle of Lipnic: Stephen the Great defeats the Volga Tatars of the Golden Horde, led by Ahmed Khan.
 September 13 – A rebellion orchestrated by King Edward IV of England's former ally, Richard Neville, 16th Earl of Warwick, forces the King to flee England to seek support from his brother-in-law, Charles the Bold of Burgundy.  
 October 3 – Warwick releases Henry VI of England from the Tower of London, and restores him to the throne.
 November 28 –  Emperor Lê Thánh Tông of Đại Việt launches a naval expedition against Champa, beginning the Cham–Annamese War.
 December 18 – Lê Thánh Tông leads the Đại Việt army into Champa, conquering the country in less than three months.

 Date unknown 
 The Pahang Sultanate is established at Pahang Darul Makmur (in modern-day Malaysia).
 The first contact occurs between Europeans and the Fante nation of the Gold Coast, when a party of Portuguese land and meet with the King of Elmina.
 Johann Heynlin introduces the printing press into France and prints his first book this same year.
 In Tonga, in or around 1470, the Tuʻi Tonga Dynasty cedes its temporal powers to the Tuʻi Haʻatakalaua Dynasty, which will remain prominent until about 1600.
 Between this year and 1700, 8,888 witches are tried in the Swiss Confederation; 5,417 of them are executed.
 Sir George Ripley dedicates his book, The Compound of Alchemy, to the King Edward IV of England.
 The Chimor–Inca War ends with an Inca victory. The Chimor Empire is absorbed into the Inca Empire.

Births 
 January 1 – Magnus I, Duke of Saxe-Lauenburg, German noble (d. 1543)
 February 16 – Eric I, Duke of Brunswick-Lüneburg, Prince of Calenberg (1491–1540) (d. 1540)
 April 7 – Edward Stafford, 2nd Earl of Wiltshire (d. 1498)
 April 9 – Giovanni Angelo Testagrossa, Italian composer (d. 1530)
 May 20 – Pietro Bembo, Italian cardinal (d. 1547)
 June 30 – Charles VIII of France (d. 1498)
 July 13 – Francesco Armellini Pantalassi de' Medici, Italian Catholic cardinal (d. 1528)
 July 20 – John Bourchier, 1st Earl of Bath, English noble (d. 1539)
 July 30 – Hongzhi Emperor of China (d. 1505)
 August 4
 Bernardo Dovizi, Italian Catholic cardinal (d. 1520)
 Lucrezia de' Medici, Italian noblewoman (d. 1553)
 October 2
 George I of Münsterberg, Imperial Prince, Duke of Münsterberg and Oels, Graf von Glatz (d. 1502)
 Isabella of Aragon, Queen of Portugal, daughter of Isabella I of Castile and Ferdinand II of Aragon (d. 1498)
 Isabella of Aragon, Duchess of Milan, daughter of Alfonso II of Naples (d. 1524)
 October 10 – Selim I, Sultan of the Ottoman Empire (d. 1520)
 October 15 – Konrad Mutian, German humanist (d. 1526)
 November 2 – King Edward V of England, the elder of the "Princes in the Tower" (d. c. 1483)
 November 28 – Wen Zhengming, artist in Ming dynasty China (d. 1559)
 December 5 – Willibald Pirckheimer, German humanist (d. 1530)
 date unknown
 Juan Díaz de Solís, Spanish navigator and explorer (d. 1516)
 Tang Yin, Chinese painter (d. 1524)
 Polydore Vergil, Urbinate/English historian (d. 1555)
 probable
 Matthias Grünewald, German painter (d. 1528)
 Hayuya, Taino chief (d. unknown)
 Hugh Latimer, Protestant martyr (d. 1555)

Deaths 
 January 2 – Heinrich Reuß von Plauen, Grand Master of the Teutonic Order 
 March 20 – Thomas Talbot, 2nd Viscount Lisle, English nobleman killed at the Battle of Nibley Green (b. c.1449)
 May 15 – Charles VIII of Sweden (b. 1409)
 August 31 – Frederick II, Count of Vaudémont (b. c.1428)
 October 18 – John Tiptoft, 1st Earl of Worcester, Lord High Treasurer (b. 1427)
 November 23 – Gaston, Prince of Viana (b. 1444)
 December 16 – John II, Duke of Lorraine (b. 1425)
 date unknown
 Domenico da Piacenza, Italian dancing master (b. 1390)
 Pal Engjëlli, Albanian Catholic clergyman (b. 1416)
 probable – Jacopo Bellini, Italian painter (b. 1400)

References